Walter Rose may refer to:

 Walter Rose (politician), American politician and real estate developer
 Walter Rose (footballer) (1912–1989), German international footballer
 Tam Rose (full name Walter Sumner Rose; 1888–1961), American football player and coach

See also
 Rose (surname)